The 10th constituency of Essonne is a French legislative constituency in the Essonne département.

Description

The 10th constituency of Essonne was one of six additional seats created in 1988 to address the rising population in the department.

The seat consistently supported the Socialist Party at every election from its creation in 1988 until 2017, when it was won by the centrist LREM party. It swung back left in 2022, when it was gained by the left-wing LFI party.

Historic representation

Election results

2022

 
 
 
 
 
 
 
 
|-
| colspan="8" bgcolor="#E9E9E9"|
|-

2017

 
 
 
 
 
 
 
 
|-
| colspan="8" bgcolor="#E9E9E9"|
|-

2012

 
 
 
 
 
 
 
|-
| colspan="8" bgcolor="#E9E9E9"|
|-

2007

 
 
 
 
 
 
|-
| colspan="8" bgcolor="#E9E9E9"|
|-

2002

 
 
 
 
 
 
 
|-
| colspan="8" bgcolor="#E9E9E9"|
|-

1997

 
 
 
 
 
 
 
|-
| colspan="8" bgcolor="#E9E9E9"|
|-

Sources

Official results of French elections from 2002: "Résultats électoraux officiels en France" (in French).

10